Ivan Ivanov Stanchov (1 April 1929 – 24 November 2021) was a Bulgarian politician and diplomat who served as Minister of Foreign Affairs. He served in the non-party, interim Cabinet led by Prime Minister Reneta Indzhova from 1994 and 1995.

References

1929 births
2021 deaths
Bulgarian politicians
Bulgarian diplomats
Foreign ministers of Bulgaria